Colin Agnew McDonald (born 15 October 1930 at Bury, Lancashire) is an English former football goalkeeper.

He played for Burnley from 1953 to 1959, making 201 total appearances, until a leg injury forced his retirement. He also played eight matches for the England national football team, including all four matches in the 1958 FIFA World Cup.

The broken leg that would ultimately end his career came in an accidental clash with Liam Tuohy. The game was played between the Football League and League of Ireland at Dalymount Park on St Patrick's Day 1959. The attendance for the game, which  ended 0-0, was given by the Irish Independent at that time as 35,000.

References

Burnley profile

1930 births
Living people
English footballers
England international footballers
Association football goalkeepers
Burnley F.C. players
1958 FIFA World Cup players
English Football League players
Bolton Wanderers F.C. non-playing staff
English football managers
Wycombe Wanderers F.C. managers
Altrincham F.C. players
Wycombe Wanderers F.C. players
Footballers from Bury, Greater Manchester
English Football League representative players
Oxford United F.C. players